The Bangladesh Army Stadium (formerly the Ershad Army Stadium) is a multi-purpose stadium in Dhaka, Bangladesh. It is currently used mostly for football matches, and hosts the home sport matches of the Bangladesh Army. The stadium has a capacity of 20,000. In 2021 Pandemic, this stadium used for Covid testing venue, for the people going abroad.

See also
List of football stadiums in Bangladesh
Stadiums in Bangladesh

References

Football venues in Bangladesh
Bangladesh Army